Crocus biflorus subsp. stridii is a subspecies of flowering plant in the genus Crocus of the family Iridaceae, found  in the northeastern Greece and particular in Xanthi and Thessaloniki.

biflorus subsp. stridii
Plant subspecies